Italy men's national canoe polo team is the national team side of Italy at international canoe polo.

Palmarès

See also
Italy at the team sports international competitions
Italy women's national canoe polo team

References

External links
 Canoe polo - La Nazionale

Italy team
Canoe polo